Akram Masih Gill  is a Pakistani politician who served as member of the National Assembly of Pakistan.

Political career
He was elected to the National Assembly of Pakistan on a seat reserved for minorities as a candidate of Pakistan Muslim League (Q) in the 2008 Pakistani general election.

In 2011, he was inducted into the federal cabinet of Prime Minister Yousaf Raza Gillani and was made Minister of State for National Harmony.

References

Living people
Year of birth missing (living people)
Pakistani MNAs 2008–2013